Eva Pavlová (née Zelená; born 5 November 1964) is the First Lady of the Czech Republic and wife of the president of the Czech Republic Petr Pavel. She is a lieutenant colonel of the Czech army in the reserve and a member of the municipal assembly in her home municipality of Černouček.

Biography
She graduated from grammar school and, as part of her sports activities, was mainly involved in shooting. After graduating in 1983, she continued her studies at the Female Military Vocational School at the High Military Aviation School in Košice. In 1985, she decided to continue her military career and signed up to study at the Military Political Academy in Bratislava in a program intended for future communist political commissars. She later stated that she was initially informed that she did not have a suitable "staff profile". She thus submitted an application to the Communist Party of Czechoslovakia. She finished school in 1990. At the beginning of the Velvet Revolution, on 20 November 1989, she resigned from the Communist Party. She then evaluated her membership in the party as a mistake.

She then met Petr Pavel at the garrison dormitory in Prostějov. However, since they both had partners, their relationship did not begin until several years later. The wedding took place in 2004. She later worked at the General Staff at time when Petr Pavel was Chief of Staff, being put in charge of communication with foreign military and aviation attachés to the Czech Republic. After leaving the army, she started working as an assistant in Prague based family mediation center Manofi. She lives with her husband in the village of Černouček. She participated in the 2022 municipal elections as a non-party member of SNK Černouček 2022 and was elected as a member of the municipal assembly.

Family
She has a daughter Eva (born 1992) from her previous marriage. Petr Pavel is the father of sons Jan (born 1990) and Petr (born 1993) from his previous marriage. At the end of 2022 they were the grandparents of four grandchildren together.

References

1964 births
Living people
First ladies of the Czech Republic
People from Šumperk
Petr Pavel